The Evanston/Skokie School District 65 is a school district headquartered in Evanston, Illinois north of Chicago, United States. The district serves Evanston and Skokie, operating elementary schools, middle schools, and K-8 schools.

Schools

K-8 schools
These are the only 2 selective enrollment schools in the district.
 Dr. Bessie Rhodes School of Global Studies (Skokie)
 Dr. Martin Luther King Jr. Literary and Fine Arts School (Evanston)

Middle schools
 Chute Middle School (Evanston)
 Haven Middle School (Evanston)
 Nichols Middle School (Evanston)

Elementary schools
 Dawes Elementary School (Evanston)
 Dewey Elementary School (Evanston)
 Kingsley Elementary School (Evanston)
 Lincoln Elementary School (Evanston)
 Lincolnwood Elementary School (Evanston)
 Oakton Elementary School (Evanston)
 Orrington Elementary School (Evanston)
 Walker Elementary School (Evanston)
 Washington Elementary School (Evanston)
 Willard Elementary School (Evanston)

Early childhood
 Joseph E. Hill (JEH) Education Center (Evanston)
Also one of the headquarters in the district.

Special schools
 Park School (Evanston) - For students ages 3-21: students with physical and/or learning difficulties
 Daniel and Ada Rice Education Center (REC) (Evanston) - Disciplinary school

See also 

 List of school districts in Illinois

References

External links
 Evanston/Skokie School District 65

School districts in Cook County, Illinois
Education in Evanston, Illinois
Education in Skokie, Illinois